Achille Larue (October 27, 1849 – May 1, 1922) was a lawyer and political figure in Quebec. He represented Bellechasse in the House of Commons of Canada from 1878 to 1881 as a Liberal member.

He was born in St-Jean, Île d'Orléans, Canada East, the son of Nazaire La Rue and Adelaide Roy. Larue was educated at the Séminaire de Quebec and the Université Laval. He was admitter to the Quebec bar in 1872 and set up practice in Quebec City. Larue was an unsuccessful candidate for a seat in the House of Commons in an 1875 by-election. He was elected in the 1878 federal election; his election was overturned in 1881 after an appeal. He was president of Le Club Canadien. Larue died in Quebec City at the age of 72.

References 
 
The Canadian parliamentary companion and annual register, 1879 CH Mackintosh

1849 births
1922 deaths
Members of the House of Commons of Canada from Quebec
Liberal Party of Canada MPs